In enzymology, a 3-(hydroxyamino)phenol mutase is an enzyme that catalyzes the chemical reaction

3-hydroxyaminophenol  aminohydroquinone

Hence, this enzyme has one substrate, 3-hydroxyaminophenol, and one product, aminohydroquinone.

This enzyme belongs to the family of isomerases, specifically those intramolecular transferases transferring hydroxy groups.  The systematic name of this enzyme class is 3-(hydroxyamino)phenol hydroxymutase. Other names in common use include 3-hydroxylaminophenol mutase, and 3HAP mutase.

References 

 

EC 5.4.4
Enzymes of unknown structure